Gustav (January 28, 1568 – February, 1607) was a Swedish prince, the son of Eric XIV and Karin Månsdotter.

Biography 
The infant Gustav was present at his mother's wedding to the King of Sweden in 1568 and at her coronation, together with his sister Sigrid. The presence of the children was a way to demonstrate their new status: both of them were officially confirmed as legitimate, and Gustav and his sister were given all the privileges of a royal prince and princess.

After his father's dethronement, Gustav was sent to live outside of Sweden in 1575, to protect him from King John III who feared that the supporters of Eric would try to deprive his son of the crown. Gustav came to Poland where he lived in poverty and despair. At some time during his stay he became a Catholic.

Ivan IV of Russia attempted to persuade Gustav to help him in his political ambitions around the Baltic, but these attempts (which included both promises and several years' exile) failed.

In August 1599 Gustav arrived in Moscow for a proposed marriage to the Tsar Boris Godunov's daughter Ksenia.  But there, he lived a self-indulgent life. As a result, the Tsar eventually broke off the engagement of his daughter.

As compensation, the homeless Gustav received the principality of Uglich, where he lived until the beginning of the reign of the False Dmitry, who ordered his arrest by the demands of his ally — Sigismund III Vasa (cousin of Gustav and son of King John III) and sent him to Yaroslavl jail. After the death of the False Dmitry, the new tsar, Vasili IV of Russia, released Gustav and sent him to live in the small city of Kashin, Russia.

Gustav Eriksson Vasa died in February 1607 in Kashin and was buried there February 22. He was in older history writing thought to have had four children with a certain Brita Karth and perhaps even have married her.  This has however been refuted by modern historians.

Gustav is the main character of the famous Polish novel "Gwiazda spadająca" by Jadwiga Żylińska.

References

1568 births
1607 deaths
Gustav 1568
Heirs apparent who never acceded
House of Vasa
Disinherited European royalty
Sons of kings